Edith Elura Tilton Penrose (November 15, 1914 – October 11, 1996) was an American-born British economist whose best known work is The Theory of the Growth of the Firm, which describes the ways which firms grow and how fast they do. Writing in The Independent, the economist Sir Alec Cairncross stated that the book brought Dr. Penrose "instant recognition as a creative thinker, and its importance to the analysis of the job of management has been increasingly realized".

Biography

Personal and marital life
Edith Tilton was born on 29 November 1914 at Sunset Boulevard in Los Angeles. She received a bachelor's degree in 1936 from the University of California at Berkeley. In 1936 she married David Burton Denhardt, who died two years later in a hunting accident, leaving her with an infant son. She moved to Baltimore, and took her MA and PhD under the supervision of Fritz Machlup at Johns Hopkins University. In 1945 she married Ernest F. Penrose, a British-born economist and writer who had been one of her teachers at Berkeley. After working for the American Embassy in London, she received her doctorate in 1950. In 1984 Penrose received an honorary doctorate from the Faculty of Social Sciences at Uppsala University, Sweden.
Her first book, Economics of the International Patent System, was published in 1951.

McCarthyism and departure from US
Dr. Penrose was a lecturer and research associate at Johns Hopkins University for many years. When fellow academic Owen Lattimore was accused by Senator Joseph McCarthy of being a Soviet spy, Penrose and her husband played a central role in his defence. Because of this experience, Penrose became disillusioned with the US and the couple went on sabbatical leave, first to the Australian National University in Canberra and then to Baghdad University.

Baghdad and the oil industry
While in Baghdad, Penrose saw an opportunity to study the economics of the oil industry. This work culminated in a book, The Large International Firm in Developing Countries: The International Petroleum Industry, which was published in 1968. After the overthrow of the Hashemite monarchy, the couple were expelled from Iraq and drove across the Syrian Desert, through Turkey and on to the UK.

Move to UK
In 1959, she took a joint readership post in economics with at the London School of Economics and the School of Oriental and African Studies (SOAS). In 1964 she was appointed chair of economics with special reference to Asia at the SOAS, a post which she held until 1978. During this time she continued her interest in multinational oil companies, travelling extensively. She also became involved in a number of academic and public bodies including the Monopolies Commission and was elected a fellow of the Royal Commonwealth Society in 1985.

INSEAD
At age 64, Penrose retired from SOAS and took up a position as professor of political economy at INSEAD in Fontainebleau, France. When her husband died in 1984 she retired from INSEAD and moved back to the UK settling at Waterbeach, Cambridgeshire near to her surviving sons.

Contribution to Economics

The Theory of the Growth of the Firm
While at Johns Hopkins, Penrose participated in a research project on the growth of firms. She came to the conclusion that the existing theory of the firm was inadequate to explain how firms grow. Her insight was to realize that the 'Firm' in theory is not the same thing as 'flesh and blood' organizations that businessmen call firms. This insight eventually led to the publication of her second book, The Theory of the Growth of the Firm in 1959. In the introduction to the book, she writes: "All the evidence we have indicates that the growth of firms is connected with the attempts of a particular group of human beings to do something." In theorizing about companies that grow, Dr. Penrose wrote: "There are important administrative restraints on the speed of the firm's growth. Human resources required for the management of change are tied to the individual firm and so are internally scarce. Expansion requires the recruitment of more such resources. New recruits cannot become fully effective overnight. The growth process is, therefore, dynamically constrained."

Resource-Based View of the Firm
Penrose is considered to be the first economist who posited what has become known as the Resource-based view of the firm. Strategic resources are those which are rare, difficult to duplicate, valuable, and over which a firm has control. Resources can be raw materials, such as a gold mine or oil well, or intellectual, such as patents, and even trademarks and brands (such as the valuation of the Coca-Cola brand).

Published works
 The Economics of the International Patent System, Baltimore, Johns Hopkins Press, 1951, 
 The Theory of the Growth of the Firm, New York, John Wiley and Sons, 1959, 
 The Growth of the Firm—A Case Study: The Hercules Powder Company, Business History Review, Volume 34 Spring Issue, S. 1-23, 1960
 The Large International Firm in Developing Countries: The International Petroleum Industry, London, Allen & Unwin, 1968, 
 New Orientations: Essays in International Relations, with Peter Lyon, Frank Cass & Co, 1970, 
 Iraq: International Relations and National Development, with Ernest Penrose, Boulder, Westview Press, 1978,

Notes

Bibliography

External links

1914 births
1996 deaths
British economists
British women economists
20th-century American economists
20th-century American women scientists
20th-century American scientists
Fellows of the Royal Commonwealth Society
Academics of SOAS University of London
American women academics
American emigrants to the United Kingdom